Stobno may refer to the following places in Poland:
Stobno, Lower Silesian Voivodeship (south-west Poland)
Stobno, Kuyavian-Pomeranian Voivodeship (north-central Poland)
Stobno, Czarnków-Trzcianka County in Greater Poland Voivodeship (west-central Poland)
Stobno, Kalisz County in Greater Poland Voivodeship (west-central Poland)
Stobno, West Pomeranian Voivodeship (north-west Poland)